Appy is a commune in the Ariège department in the Occitanie region of southwestern France.

The inhabitants of the commune are known as Pynarols or Pynaroles

Geography
Appy is located some 15 km south-east of Tarascon-sur-Ariège and 12 km north-west of Ax-les-Thermes. Access is by the D20 road from Axiat in the east passing through the village and continuing to Caychax in the west. Appy is a remote mountainous commune, heavily forested in the south and west, with the rest alpine terrain.

In the north of the commune is the Etang d'Appy from which flows the Ruisseau de Lac d'Appy towards the south-west to join the Ruisseau de Caychax which joins the Ariège at Albiès. The eastern boundary of the commune is formed by the Ruisseau de Girabel which flows south joining with other streams to join the Ariege at Urs. The Ruisseau de Camelong rises north of the village and flows south-east to join the Ruisseau de la Cassagne.

Neighbouring communes and villages

Administration

List of Successive Mayors

Demography
The village became almost uninhabited, so much so that there was a period of 64 years without a marriage: there was a marriage in 1946 then one in 2010 which was the subject of an article in La Dépêche du Midi.

See also
Communes of the Ariège department

References

External links
Appy on Géoportail, National Geographic Institute (IGN) website 
Appi on the 1750 Cassini Map

Communes of Ariège (department)